Zodarion aculeatum is a spider species found in Bulgaria, Romania, Serbia and North Macedonia.

See also
 List of Zodariidae species

References

External links

aculeatum
Spiders of Europe
Spiders described in 1897